Air France flies to 29 domestic destinations and 201 international destinations in 94 countries across Africa, Americas, Asia, Europe and Oceania .

History

Air France was founded on 7 October 1933 as a merger of several French aviation companies. The network started with destinations across Europe, to French colonies in North Africa and farther afield. The 1937 route map shows European, African and Asian routes. In 1946 the network covered 160,000 km, claimed to be the longest in the world. The Paris-New York line (a 19h50 flight on a DC4) was first served on 1 July 1946 departing from Le Bourget Airport. Starting from mars 1950, the Asian destinations (Paris-Saigon) are deserved with the Lockheed Constellation (L 049) which needs only 33 hours (more than 60 hours with the DC 4). In 1952 the departures move to the Paris Orly-Sud airport and the network extends 250,000 km. Los Angeles and Rio de Janeiro started to be served directly in the jet age of the 1960s. In 1983, served 150 places in 73 countries, forming a network of 634,400 km.

List
This list of Air France destinations includes the city, country, and the airport's name, with the airline's hubs marked. The list with destinations marks if the services are seasonal, and adds dates for new future entries. This list includes Air France Cargo services and those destinations served for Air France by its subsidiaries and franchisees Air Corsica, Air France Hop, Airlinair, Chalair and CityJet.

Notes

See also
Air France–KLM
List of KLM destinations
List of KLM Cityhopper destinations
List of Transavia France destinations
List of Transavia destinations

References

External links
Air France network map
Air France Travel guide
Air France Cargo destinations

Lists of airline destinations
Air France–KLM
SkyTeam destinations
France transport-related lists